The Legend of Marilyn Monroe is a 1966 American documentary film chronicling the life and career of actress Marilyn Monroe. Directed by Terry Sanders, and narrated by John Huston, the film was also released under the title The Marilyn Monroe Story in the UK.

Cast 
James Dougherty, Jerry Giesler, Milton H. Greene, Tom Kelley, Robert Mitchum, Lee Strasberg, Paula Strasberg and Shelley Winters appear as themselves.

Theodore Curphey, Tony Curtis, Joe DiMaggio, John F. Kennedy, Peter Lawford, Groucho Marx, Arthur Miller, Laurence Olivier, Queen Elizabeth II, Jane Russell and Billy Wilder appear in archived footage.

See also
List of American films of 1966

External links

1966 films
American black-and-white films
Documentary films about actors
Documentary films about women in film
1966 documentary films
Films about Marilyn Monroe
Films produced by David L. Wolper
1960s English-language films